Corson Ceulemans (born May 5, 2003) is a Canadian collegiate ice hockey defenceman who plays for the Cleveland Monsters in the American Hockey League (AHL) as a prospect under contract to the Columbus Blue Jackets of the National Hockey League (NHL). Ceulemans was selected in the first round of the 2021 NHL Entry Draft by the Blue Jackets with the 25th overall selection.

Playing career
As a junior Ceulemans played in the Alberta Junior Hockey League (AJHL) with the Brooks Bandits. He committed to a collegaite career with the University of Wisconsin of the Big Ten Conference (B1G). 

Following his selection in the 2021 NHL Entry Draft in the first-round by the Blue Jackets, Ceulemans joined the Badgers as a freshman in the 2021–22 season. He collected 7 goals and 22 points in 34 appearances. He captured the team's Mark Johnson Rookie of the Year Award after leading the team in assists and points.

In the 2022–23 season, his sophomore year with the Badgers, Ceulemans recorded 8 goals and 15 assists for 23 points in 33 contests, leading the team on the blueline in scoring. 

At the conclusion of Wisconsin's season, Ceulemans opted to conclude his collegiate career and was signed to a three-year, entry-level contract by the Columbus Blue Jackets on March 7, 2023. With the contract to start in the following season, Ceuleman was immediately signed to a tryout contract in joining AHL affiliate, the Cleveland Monsters, for the remainder of their 2022–23 campaign.

Career statistics

Regular season and playoffs

International

References

External links
 

2003 births
Living people
Brooks Bandits players
Canadian ice hockey defencemen
Cleveland Monsters players
Columbus Blue Jackets draft picks
Ice hockey people from Alberta
National Hockey League first-round draft picks
Wisconsin Badgers men's ice hockey players